Dancer, Texas Pop. 81 is a 1998 comedy-drama film starring Breckin Meyer, Peter Facinelli, Eddie Mills, and Ethan Embry.

Plot
The film is set in the small, fictional American town of Dancer (Brewster County, Texas). Only 81 people live in this town. Following their high school graduation, four young men wrestle with their decisions to leave for Los Angeles.

Cast
 Breckin Meyer as Keller Coleman
 Peter Facinelli as Terrell Lee Lusk
 Eddie Mills as John Hemphill
 Ethan Embry as "Squirrel"
 Ashley Johnson as Josie Hemphill
 Patricia Wettig as Mrs. Lusk
 Michael O'Neill as Mr. Lusk
 Eddie Jones as Earl
 Wayne Tippit as Keller's Grandfather
 Alexandra Holden as Vivian
 Keith Szarabajka as Squirrel's Father
 Shawn Weatherly as Sue Ann
 Michael Crabtree as Mr. Hemphill
 Lashawn McIvor as Mrs. Hemphill

Reception
Dancer, Texas Pop. 81 received positive reviews and holds an 80% rating on Rotten Tomatoes based on 15 reviews.

The film reviewer Joe M. O'Connell, writing for the San Antonio Express-News, called the film "the finest representation of small-town Texas since The Last Picture Show". The movie was filmed in Fort Davis, Texas.

References

External links
 
 
 
 

1998 films
1990s English-language films
1998 comedy-drama films
1998 directorial debut films
1998 independent films
American comedy-drama films
American independent films
Films directed by Tim McCanlies
Films scored by Steve Dorff
Films set in Texas
Films shot in Texas
Films with screenplays by Tim McCanlies
TriStar Pictures films
1990s American films